Danieley is a surname. Notable people with the surname include:

James Danieley (1924–2016), American academic administrator
Jason Danieley (born 1971), American actor, singer, concert performer, and recording artist

See also
Daniele